Tristram Tyrwhitt (c. 1530 – 1590) was the member of Parliament for Huntingdon in 1571, Derby in 1572, and Great Grimsby in 1586 and 1589.

References 

1530s births
1590 deaths
Year of birth uncertain
Members of the Parliament of England for Great Grimsby
English MPs 1571
English MPs 1572–1583
English MPs 1586–1587
English MPs 1589